Michael Lerjéus (born 1973) is a Swedish football referee. Lerjéus currently resides in Skövde.  He was a full international referee for FIFA between 2009 and 2015.

He became a professional referee in 1996 and was an Allsvenskan referee from 2006 up until his retirement. Lerjéus had refereed 156 matches in Allsvenskan, 114 matches in Superettan and 31 international matches as of 2014.

See also 

 List of football referees

References

External links 
FIFA
SvFF

1973 births
Living people
Swedish football referees
UEFA Champions League referees
UEFA Europa League referees